Portalia mira is a fossil from the Burgess Shale that was originally described by Charles Walcott as a holothurian echinoderm.  A later interpretation by F. Madsen in 1957 posits P. mira as a sponge.

References

External links
 

Burgess Shale animals
Enigmatic prehistoric animal genera

Fossil taxa described in 1918
Cambrian genus extinctions